The Radiodiffusion Télévision Congolaise is the national broadcaster of the Central African state of Republic of the Congo. Télévision Congolaise is headquartered in the capital city Brazzaville.

See also
 Media of the Republic of the Congo

References
Broadcast Africa

Publicly funded broadcasters
Television stations in the Republic of the Congo
Television channels and stations established in 1975
State media